Zhang Ziyi (born 9 February 1979) is a Chinese actress and model. She is regarded as one of the Four Dan Actresses of China. Her first major role was in The Road Home (1999). She later gained international recognition for her role in Ang Lee's Crouching Tiger, Hidden Dragon (2000), which was nominated for 10 Academy Awards. Zhang has also appeared in Rush Hour 2 (2001), Hero (2002), and House of Flying Daggers (2004). Her most critically acclaimed works are Memoirs of a Geisha (2005), which earned her nominations for the Golden Globe Award for Best Actress – Motion Picture Drama, the BAFTA Award for Best Actress in a Leading Role, and the Screen Actors Guild Award for Outstanding Performance by a Female Actor in a Leading Role; and The Grandmaster (2013), for which she won 12 different Best Actress awards to become the most awarded Chinese actress for a single film.

From 2004 to 2010, Zhang ranked in the Top 5 of Forbes China Celebrity 100 list every year. In 2008, she was awarded with the Outstanding Contribution to Chinese Cinema award at the 11th Shanghai International Film Festival. In 2013, she received the French Cultural Order at the Ordre des Arts et des Lettres.

Zhang most recently appeared in the films The Cloverfield Paradox (2018) and Godzilla: King of the Monsters (2019).

Early life
Zhang was born and raised in Beijing, China on 9 February 1979. Her father, Zhang Yuanxiao, was an accountant and later economist, and her mother, Li Zhousheng, a kindergarten teacher. She has an older brother with whom she is very close. Zhang began studying dance when she was 8 years old; subsequently, she joined the Beijing Dance Academy at her parents' suggestion at the age of 11. While at this boarding school, she noticed how mean the other girls were to each other while competing for status amongst the teachers. Zhang disliked the attitudes of her peers and teachers so much that, on one occasion, she ran away from the school. At the age of 15, Zhang won the national youth dance championship and also appeared in a handful of TV commercials and began appearing in television commercials in Hong Kong.

In 1996, Zhang entered the Central Academy of Drama in Beijing at the age of 17.

Career

1996–2000: Early career
Zhang made her acting debut in the television film Touching Starlight at the age of 16.

In 1998, while she was studying in Central Academy of Drama, Zhang was offered her first role by director Zhang Yimou in his film The Road Home, which won the Silver Bear prize at the 2000 Berlin International Film Festival.
Zhang plays a country girl in love with the town's young teacher. She won the Best Actress Award at the 2000 Hundred Flowers Awards for her performance.

Due to her success, Zhang was considered one of the Four Dan Actresses of China.

2000–06: Wuxia epics and international breakthrough
Zhang rose to international fame in 2000 with her role as Yu Jiaolong in Ang Lee's re-visioned martial arts film Crouching Tiger, Hidden Dragon. The movie's success in the US and Europe helped her break into Hollywood. Zhang plays a young Manchu noblewoman who has secretly learned martial arts and runs off to become a wandering swordswoman rather than commit to an arranged marriage. This role won her the Most Promising Actress award at the Chicago Film Critics Association Awards and Best Supporting Actress awards from the Independent Spirit Awards, as well as Toronto Film Critics Association Awards.

Zhang then appeared in her first American film, Rush Hour 2 (2001) opposite Jackie Chan and Chris Tucker. On playing her first villain role, Zhang expressed that "the opportunity to sort of try and analyze the psyche of the character and get to know and pull out emotions I’ve never had to utilize before...was very exciting."

In 2002, Zhang co-starred in Hero alongside Jet Li, Maggie Cheung and Tony Leung, directed by her early mentor Zhang Yimou. The film was a huge success in the English-speaking world and was nominated for an Oscar and a Golden Globe award in the category of Best Foreign Language Film. She then signed on to film an avant-garde drama film Purple Butterfly (2003), which competed in the 2003 Cannes Film Festival.

Zhang went back to the martial arts genre in House of Flying Daggers (2004), again by Zhang Yimou, where she starred along Takeshi Kaneshiro and Andy Lau. She plays the blind dancing girl Mei, who despite the lack of eyesight, is a skilled fighter. In preparation for the part, Zhang spent two months living with an actual blind girl. Her performance earned her a Best Actress nomination at the BAFTA Awards. She also featured on the House of Flying Daggers soundtrack with her own musical rendition of the ancient Chinese poem Jia Rén Qu (佳人曲, The Beauty Song).

Zhang next starred in Wong Kar-wai's romantic drama film 2046 (2004), which featured many top Chinese actors and actresses. Critics praise Zhang for her "expressive" body language that was combined with her "reserved and complex emotions" in performance as a struggling prostitute. Zhang won Best Actress awards at the Hong Kong Film Critics' Award and Hong Kong Film Academy Award.

In 2005, Zhang featured in the critically acclaimed film Jasmine Women, adapted from Su Tong's novel titled Women's Lives. She won Best Actress at the Golden Rooster Awards for her performance. Next came Princess Raccoon (2005), directed by Japan's Seijun Suzuki, which premiered at the Cannes Film Festival. For her role, Zhang took two weeks of singing and dancing lessons in Japan.

Zhang played the lead role of Sayuri in the American film adaptation based on the international bestseller  Memoirs of a Geisha. Controversy arose in China about having a Chinese woman portray a prominent Japanese geisha in a film set during the height of Japanese imperialist aggression against China in World War II. Nonetheless, the film was a box office hit in the West. For the role, Zhang was nominated for the Golden Globe Award for Best Actress – Motion Picture Drama, the BAFTA Award for Best Actress in a Leading Role, and the Screen Actors Guild Award for Outstanding Performance by a Female Actor in a Leading Role.

On 27 June 2005, Zhang accepted an invitation to join the Academy of Motion Picture Arts and Sciences (AMPAS), placing her among the ranks of those who are able to vote on the Academy Awards. In May 2006, Zhang was chosen as a jury member of Feature Films at the 2006 Cannes Film Festival.

Zhang returned to China in 2006 for the Chinese wuxia film The Banquet, directed by Feng Xiaogang. The film is a loose adaptation of William Shakespeare's Hamlet.

2007–12: Hollywood and China
In 2007, Zhang performed the voice of Karai in the American animated film TMNT (2007). In the same year, Zhang starred alongside Liu Ye and Ge You in the first-ever opening short for the Chinese academy awards (Golden Rooster Awards) where director Dayyan Eng got top stars to spoof the action-movie genre in a humorous send-up on national TV in China.

In Forever Enthralled (2008), which tells the story of legendary Peking opera actor Mei Lanfang, Zhang appears in the second act as 
Mei's lover Meng Xiaodong. The Hollywood Reporter praised her performance as "confident and passion", giving the romance a sparkle.

Her next American film was The Horsemen (2009), where she starred opposite Dennis Quaid. Back in China, she played the titular character in romantic comedy Sophie's Revenge (2009); a comic book artist seeking to punish her unfaithful boyfriend. She then starred alongside Aaron Kwok in the AIDS-themed film Love for Life (2011).

In 2012, Zhang starred next to Cecilia Cheung and Jang Dong-gun in the Chinese-Korean co-production Dangerous Liaisons, an adaptation of the French novel Les Liaisons dangereuses, narrating Shanghai of the 1930s. Zhang was reportedly paid 20 million RMB (approximately $3.5 million) for the role. The same year, she was cast in the coming-of-age film Forever Young directed and written by Li Fangfang. The film premiered in January 2018.

2013–17: Return to stardom
In 2013, Zhang received the Ordre des Arts et des Lettres for her significant contributions to the film industry.

Zhang reunited with Wong Kar-wai and Tony Leung for The Grandmaster (2013), which also marks her return to the martial arts genre after 7 years since The Banquet (2006). The film was China's submission to the Academy Awards for Best Foreign-Language Picture. Critics praise Zhang's portrayal of Gong'Er as the "best performance she's ever delivered in the history of her career." which led to her winning several "Best Actress" trophies across Asia. The same year, she reprised her role as Sophie in My Lucky Star, a sequel to Sophie's Revenge. Described as Zhang's "breakthrough comedy role", the film topped Chinese box office on the week of its release.

In 2014, Zhang starred in John Woo's romantic epic The Crossing, based on the true story of the Taiping steamer collision and follows six characters and their intertwining love stories in Taiwan and Shanghai during the 1930s. Zhang plays a poor illiterate woman waiting for her soldier lover in 1930's Shanghai.

In 2015, Zhang produced her third film Oh My God, which stars Zhang Yixing and Li Xiaolu. She made a cameo appearance in the film. Zhang next starred in romance anthology film Run for Love and crime epic The Wasted Times.

2018–present: Hollywood epics, directorial debut and small-screen debut
In 2016, Zhang was cast in J. J. Abrams's science fiction thriller The Cloverfield Paradox, which premiered in 2018.

In 2017, Zhang was cast in the monster film Godzilla: King of the Monsters, playing a prominent character.

In 2018, Zhang was cast in her first television series, Rebel Princess.

In 2019, Zhang starred in the adventure drama film  The Climbers.

In 2021, Zhang made her directorial debut with a short titled “Shi” (Poem), one of the four stand-alone short tales of the film My Country, My Parents. She won the best new director award at the 2022 Media Honors for the film.

Ambassadorship and representation
Spokesperson for "Care for Children" 
Global Ambassador for China's Special Olympics
Image Ambassador for first Beijing International Film Festival 
Ambassador for the ScreenSingapore 2011 film festival
Friendship Ambassador for the Chinese Film Days in the Romania
Image Ambassador for the Macao Film Festival
Global Ambassador for the Children of China Pediatrics Foundation (CCPF)
Ambassador for Clé de Peau Beauté

Endorsements
Zhang was the first Chinese woman to be appointed as an Emporio Armani ambassador, which she served from 2009 to 2010. She also served as regional ambassadors for Mercedes-Benz, Garnier, Precious Platinum; and global ambassadors for Maybelline, Visa, TAG Heuer, Omega SA and Clé de Peau Beauté. Zhang was featured on the "BoF 500" list. Since 2019, she became the global ambassador for Chopard.

Defamation cases
In 2012, an overseas Chinese website Boxun falsely reported that Zhang Ziyi was paid $100 million to sleep with top Chinese officials. Zhang sued Boxun in a US court for defamation. In December 2013, Boxun settled the case after agreeing to pay an undisclosed amount to Zhang and issue a front-page apology. Zhang also won court cases in Hong Kong against Next Media over similar false reports in Apple Daily and Next Magazine.

Personal life
In the July 2006 issue of Interview magazine, Zhang spoke of her movies' contents and being careful about the roles she takes on, especially in Hollywood:

Zhang obtained Hong Kong residency in 2007 through the Quality Migrant Admission Scheme for her contribution to the local film industry. She is an admirer and collector of the works of the Chinese contemporary artist Shen Jingdong. Politically, she is a member of the Chinese Communist Party-controlled China Zhi Gong Party.

Zhang was engaged to Israeli American venture capitalist Aviv Nevo until the couple separated in 2010. Zhang married Chinese rock musician Wang Feng in May 2015. On 27 December 2015, Zhang gave birth to their daughter, Wang Xingxing. In January 2020, Zhang gave birth to their son.

Filmography

Film

Television series

Reality show

Music video

Discography

Awards and nominations

Other honors
In 2005, Zhang was listed in TIME's World's 100 Most Influential People. They called her "China's Gift to Hollywood".

In 2008, she was awarded with the "Outstanding Contribution to Chinese Cinema" at the 11th Shanghai International Film Festival.

In 2010, she was named "Actress of the Decade" by CineAsia. She previously won "Star of Tomorrow prize" back in 1999.

In 2013, Zhang received the Order of Arts and Letter at the Ordre des Arts et des Lettres Awards.

Forbes China Celebrity 100

References

External links

 

1979 births
Living people
20th-century Chinese actresses
21st-century Chinese actresses
Actresses from Beijing
Best Actress Asian Film Award winners
Central Academy of Drama alumni
Chinese female dancers
Chinese female models
Chinese film actresses
Chinese stage actresses
Chinese television actresses
Chinese voice actresses
Independent Spirit Award for Best Supporting Female winners
People with acquired residency of Hong Kong
Asia Pacific Screen Award winners